Angela "Nazar" Vero (born December 13, 1993) is an Indonesian singer and actress. Born and raised in Amsterdam, Netherlands, she studied at The Performing Arts School "Nederlandse Pop Academie (NPAC)" in Utrecht. She began her career in the show business in early 2013 when she auditioned for the television talent show X Factor Netherlands season 5. Later in 2013 she was invited by Indonesian legend and music maestro Yovie Widianto to perform as one of the guest stars at his masterpiece concert Yovie and His Friends: Irreplaceable held at Jakarta, Indonesia's biggest concert venue JCC Senayan. She performed Yovie Widianto's classic hit ' Sebatas Mimpi ', which she recycled and co-wrote the English version, that was released on the compilation album Yovie and His Friends: Irreplaceable (Repackage). In 2014 she made her movie debut playing the role of Tania in the Indonesian drama romance Mantan Terindah The Movie, produced by famous Indonesian actress and film producer Marcella Zalianty (KEANA Production), which her first single ' Demi Hati ', was released by music label Trinity Optima Production as one of the original soundtracks of the movie.

Discography

Singles

Filmography

Movies

References

External links 

 

Indonesian musicians
Indonesian actresses
1993 births
Living people